Patrick Tse Yin (born Tse Ka-yuk; 9 August 1936) is a Hong Kong actor, producer, screenwriter and director in Hong Kong cinema.

Biography
Patrick Tse began his acting career in the 1950s and remained active for the next 40 years. He is a versatile and popular actor, usually playing the leading male roles.

Tse worked briefly as writer, director and producer in the 1970s:

If Tomorrow Comes (1973) as producer/director
Madness of Love (1972) as director
One Year's Fantasy (1974) as writer/director
Love in Cubicle (1974) as writer/director
Farewell Dearest (1974) as director
The Splendid Love in Winter (1974) as writer/director
Love in Hawaii (1976) as producer/director
Confused Love (1977) as director

He stopped acting in the 1990s after immigrating to Canada, but returned to acting in 1999.

In 2022, Tse won his first ever Best Actor award from the Hong Kong Film Critics Society for the movie Time.

Filmography

Films 
This is a partial list of films.

Television

Personal life
In 1974, Tse married Zhen Zhen, a Beijing-born Taiwanese actress, but they divorced in 1978.

Tse's second wife was Deborah Lee, a Hong Kong actress. They have two children, Hong Kong actor-singer Nicholas Tse and actress and model Jennifer Tse. Tse and his family lived in Vancouver after his retirement from acting, but his family has since returned to Hong Kong. In 1996, Tse divorced Deborah Lee. In 2005, Tse's girlfriend is Coco, Shanghai girl who is 49 years his junior. Tse and Coco previously broke up in late 2017 and had since got back together again in late 2018.

See also 
 Patsy Kar

References

External links
Patrick Tse Yin at lovehkfilm.com
IMDb bio
Patrick Tse Yin at brns.com
 Patrick Tse at filmaffinity.com
HK cinemagic entry
 Patrick Tse Yin at senscritique.com

1936 births
Male actors from Guangzhou
Film directors from Guangdong
Hong Kong emigrants to Canada
Hong Kong male film actors
Hong Kong film directors
Hong Kong film producers
Hong Kong screenwriters
Living people
Naturalized citizens of Canada
People from Panyu District
20th-century Hong Kong male actors
Chinese male film actors
Screenwriters from Guangdong
Writers from Guangzhou
Hong Kong idols